On July 27, 2022, at 8:43:24 a.m. (PHT), an earthquake struck the island of Luzon in the Philippines. The earthquake had a magnitude of 7.0 , with an epicenter in Abra province. Eleven people were reported dead and 615 were injured. At least 35,798 homes, schools and other buildings were damaged or destroyed, resulting in ₱ (US$) worth of damage.

Earthquake

The tectonics of the northern Philippines and around the island of Luzon are complex. Luzon is bounded to the east and west by subduction zones. In the southern part of Luzon, the subduction zone is located east of the island along the Philippine Trench, where the Philippine Sea Plate subducts westward beneath the Sunda Plate. In northern Luzon, where the July 27 earthquake occurred, the subduction zone location and direction changes, with another trench (Manila Trench) located west of Luzon and the Sunda Plate subducts eastward beneath the Philippine Sea Plate. The complexity of plate tectonics on and around Luzon is evidenced by the diversity of faulting mechanisms in large earthquakes. Magnitude 7 or greater earthquakes in this region since 1970 have exhibited reverse, normal, and strike-slip faulting. These active plate boundaries lead to high seismic activity. Since 1970, 11 other earthquakes of magnitude 6.5 or larger have occurred within 250 km of the July 27, 2022, earthquake. The largest of these earthquakes was a magnitude 7.7 strike-slip earthquake on July 16, 1990, located approximately 215 km south of the July 27 earthquake. The 1990 earthquake killed at least 1,600 people and injured more than 3,000 people. The 1990 earthquake also caused landslides, liquefaction, subsidence, and sand boils in the Baguio–Cabanatuan–Dagupan area.

Characteristics

The earthquake occurred as a result of oblique-reverse faulting. Preliminary analysis indicates that the earthquake occurred on either of a low-angle reverse fault dipping to the east with a small component of left-lateral (strike-slip) motion, or on a steeply dipping reverse fault dipping to the northwest with a small component of right-lateral motion. The earthquake depth, mechanism, and location are consistent with the earthquake having occurred in the Philippine Sea Plate above the Sunda Plate. The Sunda Plate subducts eastward beneath Luzon with the plate boundary located off the western coast of Luzon. According to the USGS, the seismic moment released was 5.4e+19 N-m, corresponding to a moment magnitude of 7.1.

It was reported as 7.3  by the Philippine Institute of Volcanology and Seismology (PHIVOLCS).
Despite being a relatively shallow event, no surface ruptures were identified. A focal mechanism analysis indicate rupture on a reverse fault with either a northeast–southwest striking, steep dipping (69°) plane or a north–south, shallow dipping (8°) plane.

PHIVOLCS initially suspected the earthquake may have occurred on the Abra River Fault. Geologists had been aware of the potential for large earthquakes on the fault. The last known earthquake on the fault was in 1868, measuring 4.0–5.0 in magnitude. The Abra River Fault is a northern extension of the Philippine Fault Zone. As it runs through Luzon, it splays into three branches that runs beneath the southern Sierra Madre mountains, the Central Cordillera Mountains before terminating at the northern coast of the island. The three branches strike north-south and are named (west to east) the Vigan-Agao Fault, the Abra River Fault and the Digdig Fault, respectively. The Philippine Fault Zone is associated with Pliocene and Quaternary uplift of the Cordillera Mountains. The Abra River and Digdig faults display pure strike-slip displacement, while the Vigan-Agao Fault display a large thrust component. In the northern part of Luzon, the Digdig Fault display a normal component.

However the steep-dipping plane and slip sense associated with the Abra River Fault is not consistent with rupture on it. The fault which produced the mainshock had a shallow dip angle and produced oblique-reverse displacement. A scientific journal published by Rimando and others in 2022 revealed the earthquake did not occur on any of the known faults in the area. Modelling of the earthquake indicate a source west of and parallel to the Abra River Fault.

Aftershocks
At least 3,496 aftershocks were recorded by PHIVOLCS, with magnitudes in the range of 1.4 to 5.1. Sixty-three were strong enough to be felt. The strongest aftershock occurred on October 25, measuring  6.4, and having a maximum intensity of VII (Very destructive) on the PHIVOLCS Earthquake Intensity Scale. It caused extensive damage to thousands of infrastructures including homes and roads, and left 139 people injured. Two days later, four soldiers giving aid to the affected area were attacked by the New People's Army, leaving two of them dead, another injured and one missing. At least 409 aftershocks were recorded by October 26.

Intensity
On the PHIVOLCS Earthquake Intensity Scale (PEIS), intensity VII (Destructive) was instrumentally recorded in Vigan. The maximum intensity of VIII (Very destructive) was experienced in isolated areas. Intensity VII was reported in Bucloc and Manabo, Abra. In Vigan, Sinait, Bantay, San Esteban (in Ilocos Sur), Laoac (in Pangasinan), and Baguio, shaking corresponding to intensity VI (Very strong) was reported.

In an interview with a local radio station, Renato U. Solidum, the head of PHIVOLCS, it was felt with "relatively moderate intensity" in Manila, the capital of the Philippines.

Tsunami
Despite the earthquake having an inland epicentre, a tsunami of around 0.08 m (0.26 ft) was observed in Currimao, Ilocos Norte.

Response

PHIVOLCS stated that there was no tsunami threat, and an alert was not issued. Due to the inland epicenter, the earthquake could not cause seafloor uplift and trigger large waves. However, PHIVOLCS noted that shorelines and enclosed bodies of water may experience seiches due to oscillation from the earthquake.

According to the National Grid Corporation of the Philippines (NGCP), power services in Manila and the surrounding provinces were uninterrupted. The NGCP said that load tripping may have occurred.

Commanders of the Philippine National Police (PNP) in Luzon were tasked to cooperate with the regional Risk Reduction and Management Office to maximize relief operations. All PNP infrastructures were also inspected for damage. The Army and Coast Guard also were dispatched to the affected areas.

President Bongbong Marcos conducted a press briefing addressing the disaster and was scheduled to fly to Abra. He was expected to coordinate with national and local government establishments in relief efforts, but was "staying away" at the present. He added that this was so that the local government could carry out their procedures without "disturb(ing) the work (of local officials)". President Marcos has also called for telecommunication companies to give free communication to areas where transmission towers had collapsed. Local authorities stated that work and schools would be suspended in parts of Ilocos Norte to allow damage assessments to take place.

In the Ilocos region, the Department of Social Welfare and Development (DSWD) said that it would be ready to serve the affected. More than 17,410 family food packs and 9,291 non-food items had been prepared and stored at warehouses, ready for distribution. An additional ₱2.70 million (US$48.6 thousand) was set as standby for emergency response. Work and school was also suspended in Baguio by its mayor.

The Governor of Abra, Dominic Valera, declared the entire province under a state of calamity. Province officials also authorized the use of 58 percent of the Calamity Reserve Fund for relief efforts. The House of Representatives said it would allocate funds in the national budget to restore damaged buildings, including affected heritage and cultural buildings. UNICEF said that emergency supplies were on standby to support government relief efforts and to assist affected children and families.

International aid 
 : Chinese ambassador to the Philippines Huang Xilian, said that China would be ready to provide assistance. On July 29, the Chinese government provided an emergency supplies of worth .
 : Donated € (US$) to the victims of the earthquake. In addition, the EU would provide a Copernicus satellite to help assess the damage.
 : Provided emergency assistance via the Japan International Cooperation Agency.
 : South Korean government has pledged to provide US$200,000 towards humanitarian assistance. 
 :  The Taiwanese government said that its National Fire Agency was prepared to conduct rescue missions if help was requested. On August 10, the government of Taiwan provided an initial US$200,000 through Taipei Economic and Cultural Office in the Philippines (TECO).
 : Provided 3,000 shelter grade tarps through the International Organization for Migration.

Impact

Eleven fatalities were reported, including four from a landslide, and at least 616 people were injured. More than 513,330 people were affected, of which, 57,022 were displaced.

A total of 35,798 homes were affected, including 686 which were totally damaged. An additional 177 healthcare infrastructures were destroyed. Over 8,000 schools were affected. Eleven schools in Central Luzon, nine in the Cagayan Valley, eight from the Cordillera Administrative Region and seven in the Ilocos Region, were seriously damaged.

The Department of Agriculture and National Irrigation Administration also reported damage estimated at ₱ (US$). The National Irrigation Administration estimated around ₱ (US$) worth of damage to irrigation systems. There was an additional 2,383 buildings damaged, incurring a loss of ₱ (US$). Total damage was estimated to be worth ₱ (US$).

Abra
A preliminary survey of damage suggest at least 80 percent of Abra was affected. A power outage occurred across the province due to destroyed power lines. Many businesses were disrupted. Residents stayed outside their homes and were left without food. One villager died when he was hit by falling cement slabs in his house. In Bangued, a person died when the walls of a dormitory collapsed, and an additional 44 were injured due to falling debris. A 59-year-old resident from Tubo died of his injuries after the roof of his house collapsed.

The bodies of four people who were previously missing were recovered underneath the rubble of a landslide. Historical churches in the province were also affected. The Shrine of San Lorenzo Ruiz in Bangued sustained major damages with one of its bell towers was reduced to rubble. The Tayum Church in the town of the same name also sustained damage. Over 640 displaced people took refuge at the town plaza. Two bridges, one in Manabo and Bangued, respectively, were affected. Schools, and 20 government properties were damaged. At least 31 landslides were reported, and a partially collapsed hospital was evacuated. Road infrastructures including three bridges were damaged.

Baguio
Officials in Baguio stated that several crucial roadways were affected by debris. Thirty-three buildings were damaged. Road closures affected motorists along Kennon Road, Baguio–Bua–Itogon National Road and Benguet–Nueva Vizcaya Road, leaving only the Aspiras–Palispis Highway open. Patients at Baguio General Hospital were evacuated. A student at Saint Louis University was injured during a panic.

Ilocos Sur
A total of 32 towns and two cities received damage, with the heaviest in Vigan. Nearly 100 homes were heavily damaged. Heritage sites in the UNESCO World Heritage City of Vigan were damaged, including the Vigan Cathedral and old-century houses, as well as few toppled power lines along Calle Crisologo. Parts of the old historic belfry of Bantay Church in the town of the same name also crumbled to the ground. It was felt strongly in Ilocos Sur for 30 seconds or longer.

Metro Manila
The earthquake was felt strongly in Metro Manila, where minor damage to a hospital and several other buildings were reported. The earthquake prompted the Manila Metro Rail Transit System to suspend service during rush hour. Operations resumed at 10:12 a.m, with the exception of LRT Line 2 due to inspections. Occupants of the Senate building in Pasay were also evacuated.

Elsewhere
In Apayao, officials noted that two structures were damaged. Sixty-one schools were damaged, including 76 classrooms which were completely destroyed. In Kalinga, a worker fell from a building and suffered leg fractures, before being taken to the Western Kalinga District Hospital. One fatality was also reported in the province. In Ilocos Norte, bricks fell from old buildings, including at an elementary school. Cracks also appeared in the public market.

The Philippine Ports Authority (PAA) said that hairline cracks occurred in a building at the Port of Currimao, Ilocos Norte, and at a passenger terminal in Claveria, Cagayan. At Asipulo, Ifugao, a landslide partially buried an ambulance; four occupants including a pregnant woman escaped unhurt. There were two deaths in Benguet, including one in La Trinidad, who died due to falling debris from a collapsed building. At least 62 buildings were damaged in the province.

See also
List of earthquakes in 2022
List of earthquakes in the Philippines

References

External links
LUZON EARTHQUAKE: Updates, areas affected, damage, aftershocks Rappler

M 7.0 – LUZON, PHILIPPINES – 2022-07-27 00:43:23 UTC European-Mediterranean Seismological Centre event page

2022 disasters in the Philippines
2022 earthquakes
Earthquakes in the Philippines
2022 earthquake
History of Abra (province)
History of Benguet
History of Ilocos Sur
July 2022 events in the Philippines
Landslides in the Philippines